Thomas Moran (1876 – 11 February 1960) was an Irish ballad singer.

From the townland of Drumraghool North in County Leitrim, Moran was remarkable for his very large repertoire of songs which he could recite from memory. Between 1952 and 1954 the BBC collected and recorded forty-five of his songs. Some of his songs were recorded by Séamus Ennis. Known as "Old Moran, the ballad singer" during his lifetime he sang regularly in nearby Mohill town.

References and notes

Citations

Primary sources

Further reading

1876 births
1960 deaths
Irish folk singers
Irish male singers
Musicians from County Leitrim
People from Mohill